Raphaella Beatrice Spence (born 1978) is a British photorealist and hyperrealist painter.

Biography

Spence was born in London, England in 1978. At the age of twelve, she moved to Rome, Italy, with her family, where she completed her studies at St. George's British International School in 1997. Spence initially painted still lifes, but after being influenced by views of the Umbrian countryside, she turned towards a more photorealistic approach, painting landscapes. Her current works consist of high resolution digital camera images combined with freehand cityscape paintings.

Exhibitions
In 2003, Spence had her first solo exhibition in the United States at the Bernarducci Meisel Gallery in New York. Since then, many of her works have been displayed at the Bernarducci Meisel Gallery, in both solo and group exhibitions. Her paintings have been included in numerous group exhibitions as well, including at the Vero Beach Museum of Art, Mana Art Center, Arnot Art Museum, Roberson Museum of Arts & Sciences, Chiostro del Bramante, Musei Capitolini, Ringling College of Art and Design, Manhattanville College, St. Paul's Gallery, Louis K. Meisel Gallery, Elaine Baker Gallery, Albemarle Gallery, Office of the United Nations High Commissioner for Refugees, Ringling College of Art and Design, Persterer Contemporary Fine Art, Galerie De Bellefeuille, Kunsthalle Tübingen, Oklahoma City Museum of Art, Birmingham Museum and Art Gallery, Thyssen-Bornemisza Museum, Jonathan Novak Contemporary Art, New Orleans Museum of Art, and Museo de Bellas Artes de Bilbao

Solo exhibitions
 2014 "A Million Lights", Bernarducci Meisel Gallery, New York, NY
 2012 "Night and Day", Bernarducci Meisel Gallery, New York, NY
 2011 "Venice Reprise", Bernarducci Meisel Gallery, New York, NY
 2009 "Beijing", Bernarducci Meisel Gallery, New York, NY
 2007 "Crossroads", Bernarducci Meisel Gallery, New York, NY
 2005 "Bridge of Colors", Bernarducci Meisel Gallery, New York, NY 
 2004 "Solo Show", Albemarle Gallery, London, England
 2003 "Stolen Dreams", Bernarducci Meisel Gallery, New York, NY

References

External links
 Official Web Site
 Louis K. Meisel Gallery
 Persterer Fine Art

1978 births
Living people
20th-century English women artists
21st-century English women artists
20th-century English painters
21st-century English painters
Artists from London
English women painters
Photorealist artists